Randolph Ketchum Jones (October 19, 1840 – 	23 Jan 1899) was a lawyer and political figure in New Brunswick. He represented Carleton County in the Legislative Assembly of New Brunswick from 1874 to 1878.

He was born in Simonds Parish, Carleton County, the son of James Jones and Eliza Shaw, both descended from United Empire Loyalists. Jones was educated in Woodstock and in Sackville. He studied law at Harvard Law School, was called to the bar in 1867 and set up practice in Woodstock. In 1861, he married Gertrude Harriet Raymond. They had seven children, one of whom, Wendell P. Jones, was also a politician. Jones served as secretary-treasurer for the county, as clerk in the circuit court and as mayor of Woodstock. He was also treasurer for Woodstock before he became mayor in 1880 after the death of Frederick T. Bridges.

Notes
1. Carleton County sent two representatives to the Legislative Assembly during Jones' tenure. In 1874, Jones and John S. Leighton succeeded William Lindsay and George W. White.

References 
The Canadian biographical dictionary and portrait gallery of eminent and self-made men ... (1881)

1840 births
1899 deaths
Members of the Legislative Assembly of New Brunswick
Harvard Law School alumni
Mayors of Woodstock, New Brunswick